Żyrardów  is a city and former industrial hub in central Poland with approximately 41,400 inhabitants (2006).

History

Founded by the Łubieński brothers as a textile factory in 1833. One of the directors of the factory was French inventor Philippe de Girard (from Lourmarin). The city developed during the 19th century into a significant textile mill town in Poland. In honour of Girard, Ruda Guzowska was renamed Żyrardów, a toponym derived of the polonised spelling of Girard's name.

With the onset of dawn on September 12, 1939, the army of units of the 8th German army launched an attack on Żyrardów. After several hours of fierce defense of the city, the Polish army had to leave their positions and start delaying actions towards Wiskitki, Guzów, Szymanów and Paprotnia. In 1941 they transported local Jews into the Warsaw ghetto. The town museum is nowadays located in the former palace of owner of factory K. Dittrich.
A sign near the entrance to the city states that it was the only city in Europe, entirely set up for a factory.
The city was named one of Poland's official national Historic Monuments (Pomnik historii), as designated January 17, 2012.  Its listing is maintained by the National Heritage Board of Poland.

Monuments

Most of Żyrardów's monuments are located in the manufacturing area which dates from the 19th and early 20th centuries. It is widely believed that Żyrardów's textile settlement is the only complete 19th-century urban industrial complex to be preserved in Europe.

Education
 Szkoła Mistrzostwa Sportowego w Kolarstwie
 Wyższa Szkoła Rozwoju Lokalnego
 Liceum Ogólnokształcące im. Stefana Żeromskiego
 Zespół Szkół Publicznych nr. 7 im. Henryka Sienkiewicza w Żyrardowie

Sport
Since 1923 Żyrardów has a football club named Żyrardowianka Żyrardów (formerly Włókniarz Żyrardów), which in 2015/2016 played in the Polish IV League.

Notable people
 Feliks Łubieński (1758–1848), landowner who gave the estate and his blessing to his sons to build the very first textile factory
 Henryk Łubieński (1793–1883), banker and industrialist, son of Felix
 Feliks Sobański (1833–1913), philanthropist who donated land for the church
 Paweł Hulka-Laskowski (1881–1946), a writer, translator and social activist
 Leszek Miller (born 1946), former Prime Minister of Poland, started his professional life as electrician in a local textile factory
 Piotr Nowakowski (born 1987), volleyball player, double World Champion
 Gosia Rdest (born 1993), a racing driver who competed in the W Series

International relations

Twin towns — Sister cities
Żyrardów is twinned with:
  Tangshan, China
  Delchevo, North Macedonia
  Lourmarin, France
  Siero, Spain

References

External links

 Official Site of Żyrardów
 A web page of the history of Żyrardów (in Polish)
 Current Population
 Memorial Book of Zyrardow, Amshinov and Viskit
 Jewish Community in Żyrardów on Virtual Shtetl

Cities and towns in Masovian Voivodeship
Żyrardów County
Populated places established in 1833
Holocaust locations in Poland
1833 establishments in Poland